Aubrey is a city in Denton County, Texas, United States. The population was 5,006 at the 2020 census.

History

Aubrey, the town, was officially founded 1867, when Civil War veteran Lemuel Noah Edwards (1838–1910) built the second frame house there. Edwards eventually gave each of his 10 children a lot on which to build a home. The Edwards family was instrumental in several civil developments. Dancing was not allowed, but the townspeople often gathered in the Edwards home for singing and listening to music performed on an organ that Edwards had imported.

In 1881, the Texas and Pacific Railway completed a track and station in Aubrey and commenced operations.

In 1885, Edwards offered a lot to each congregation that would build a church within a year. In 1882 Edwards and Louis Caddel Sr. donated land for a one-room schoolhouse in town. Edwards, through one of his daughters—Edna Mae Edwards (1884–1975), who married Hugh Tobin (1884–1929)—was the grandfather of Louise Tobin, a prolific big band jazz vocalist who reached national notoriety in 1932.

Eventually, Aubrey became known for the peanut farms that surrounded the town. By 2009 horse ranches surrounded Aubrey. Around that time, houses were constructed in Aubrey, replacing the grounds of the old peanut farms.

Geography

Aubrey is located at  (33.307148, –96.983970).

Demographics

As of the 2020 United States census, there were 5,006 people, 1,721 households, and 1,046 families residing in the city. As of the census of 2000, there were 1,500 people, 559 households, and 418 families residing in the city. The population density was 720.4 people per square mile (278.4/km2). There were 597 housing units at an average density of 286.7 per square mile (110.8/km2).

In 2000, the racial makeup of the city was 92.5% White, 0.5% African American, 0.7% Native American, 0.5% Asian, 4.7% some other race, and 1.1% from two or more races. Hispanic or Latino of any race were 6.7% of the population. By 2020, the racial and ethnic makeup was 65.4% non-Hispanic white, 8.97% Black or African American, 0.64% Native American, 1.48% Asian, 0.06% Pacific Islander, 0.24% some other race, 4.95% multiracial, and 18.26% Hispanic or Latino of any race.

Education
Aubrey is served by the Aubrey Independent School District. The Aubrey High School mascot is the chaparral (roadrunner). A new intermediate school was completed in 2005 and now houses the middle school as of 2008. A new elementary school was completed and Aubrey Elementary School was renamed Brockett Elementary School in 2008. The old middle school building now houses the district's administration offices.

Braswell High School of the Denton Independent School District is south of Aubrey and serves some areas with "Aubrey, Texas" addresses; they are not in the Aubrey city limits.

Culture
Starr's Service Station, located off Sherman Drive and across the street from the Ever After chapel, previously served as a social center for Aubrey.  However, Starr's Service Station was sold and no longer functions as a social center.

Notable people
 Louise Tobin, big band vocalist

References

External links
 City of Aubrey official website
 Aubrey historic photos from the Portal to Texas History
 

Dallas–Fort Worth metroplex
Cities in Texas
Cities in Denton County, Texas